The 1977 French motorcycle Grand Prix was the sixth round of the 1977 Grand Prix motorcycle racing season. It took place on 29 May 1977 at Circuit Paul Ricard.

500cc classification

350 cc classification

250 cc classification

125 cc classification

Sidecar classification

References

French motorcycle Grand Prix
French
Motorcycle Grand Prix